Great Mission Teacher Training Institute (GMTTI) is a teacher training college in Dwarka, New Delhi, India.

History
Great Mission Teacher Training Institute (GMTTI) was founded in 2006 by Prabhas Education & Welfare Society.

Teacher education program
The institute offers full-time diploma programme in teacher education, which is recognized by the National Council for Teacher Education and affiliated with the State Council of Educational Research and Training, Delhi

See also
 List of teacher education schools in India

References

External links
 

Education in Delhi
Colleges of education in India
Universities and colleges in Delhi